The 1942 Fort Riley Centaurs football team represented the Cavalry Replacement Training Center at Fort Riley, a United States Army installation located in North Central Kansas, during the 1942 college football season. The team compiled a 6–3 record, including a victory over Kansas State. Lt. Curry N. Vaughn was the team's head coach.

Fort Riley also garnered attention in the fall of 1942 as the home base of boxer Joe Louis.

Schedule

References

Fort Riley
Fort Riley Centaurs football
Fort Riley Centaurs football